The Malta exiles were the purges of Ottoman intellectuals by the Allied forces. The exile to Malta occurred between March 1919 and October 1920 of politicians, high ranking soldiers (mainly), administrators and intellectuals of the Ottoman Empire after the armistice of Mudros during the Occupation of Istanbul by the Allied forces. The Malta exiles became inmates in a British prison where various Committee of Union and Progress (CUP) officials were held in the hopes that trials will be held at the Malta Tribunals at a future date.

Background 
In late January 1919, the Allied forces began to arrest CUP leaders and military commanders by accusing them of war crimes. Many Turkish intellectuals, revolutionaries and Kemalists who opposed the occupation by British were exiled to Malta after being accused of crimes. On 120 leaders of the Ottoman Empire were issued arrest warrants. These included several high ranking CUP notables such as Tevfik Rüştü Aras, Mithat Şükrü Bleda, Hüseyin Cahit Yalçın or Mustafa Rahmi Arslan and military commanders such as the Generals of the Islamic Army of the Caucasus Nuri Killigil and Mürsel Pasha and Halil Kut a military officer of the Ottoman Army in the Eastern front. Following the occupation of Smyrna by the Greek forces in May 1919, large manifestations in protest occurred on the Anatolian mainland raising pressure upon the courts martial. The judges then ordered the release of 41 suspects in order to calm down the situation. The release was not what the allied forces had in mind, and caused them to consider a better detention facility than the Bekirağa military prison, well aware that the prison might be captured by the protestors and its prisoners released. After this release the prisoners deported to Malta  The prisoners were deported to Malta on board of SS Princess Ena Malta and  starting in 1919, where they were believed to be held for some three years while searches were made in the archives of Constantinople, London, Paris and Washington to find a way to prosecute them. Most of the prisoners where held for some three years on Malta.

Initially the Allied Government sent sixty seven war criminals to Malta in a prosecution attempt coordinated by the British forces.  Later more suspects were to follow. The prisoners were secluded in three different groups.

 A: for people suspected of having taken part in massacres
 B: for people suspected of having tolerated massacres
 C: for people who were not suspected of having taken direct action in massacres
Those exiled included people unrelated to war crimes such as historian Adnan Adıvar, pharmacist Mehmet Eczacıbaşı, journalists Velid Ebüziyya, Yunus Nadi Abalıoğlu, Minister of Education Ahmet Sükrü Bey and Ziya Gökalp, showing the Malta Exiles were focused on purging Turkish intellectuals who would support the Kemalist forces in spite of the Ottoman cooperation with the Allied Government.

Turkish approach to the trials against the Malta Exiles 

At that time, the Turks had two competing governments, one based in Constantinople, the ancient capital of the Ottoman Empire now under Allied (mostly British) occupation, the other was based in Ankara, deep in the interior and away from Allied forces. The Constantinople government supported the inquiries with more or less seriousness depending on the current government. Nominally headed by the Sultan, the Turkish government based in Constantinople was politically the same state that had surrendered to the Allies at the end of WWI, accepting humiliating terms that included ceding or accepting the occupation of most of what had been the Ottoman Empire, including western Anatolia and complying with the exile of Turkish intellectuals to Malta. These circumstances sparked a nationalist backlash, leading a clique of Army officers commanding the remnants the Ottoman Army to form a rival independent  government based in Ankara. This Kemalist Government was pro-western in overall outlook and did not seek to re-establish the Ottoman Empire but rejected the humiliating terms of surrender agreed too by Constantinople, including the surrender of the Malta exiles. While grand vizir Damad Ferid Pasha (4 March - 2 October 1919 and again 5 April - 21 October 1920) stood behind the prosecuting body, the government of grand vizir Ali Riza Pasha (2 October 1919 - 2 March 1920) barely mentioned legal proceedings against the war criminals. The trials enabled the Freedom and Accord Party to expel the Committee of Union and Progress from the political arena. 

The Kemalist Ankara Government was strictly opposed to trials against the Malta exilees and their portrayal as criminals for opposing the occupation of Anatolia. Mustafa Kemal reasoned about the detainees in Malta on the occasion of the congress in Sivas on the 4 September 1919: "...should any of the detainees either already brought or yet to be brought to Istanbul be executed, even at the order of the vile Istanbul government, we would seriously consider executing all British prisoners in our custody." From February 1921 the military court in Istanbul begun releasing prisoners without trials.

Release 
The exiled later returned to Turkey in stages during 1921–1922. The release of the Turkish detainees in Malta was accomplished in exchange for 22 British prisoners held by Mustafa Kemal  amongst which figured Alfred Rawlinson, a relative of the British General Henry Rawlinson. Several of the Malta Exiles then joined the Turkish Nationalist Movement around Mustafa Kemal in Ankara.

Prisoners

Further reading
Simsir, B. Malta Surgunleri (The Malta Exiles). Istanbul, 1976.

Footnotes

Turkish War of Independence
Exiles